Joshua John Palacios (born July 30, 1995) is an American professional baseball outfielder in the Pittsburgh Pirates organization. He made his Major League Baseball (MLB) debut with the Toronto Blue Jays in 2021 and has also played for the Washington Nationals.

Amateur career
Palacios attended the High School of Telecommunication Arts and Technology in his hometown of Brooklyn, New York, and was selected as the 2013 New York City High School Player of the Year. He was selected by the Cincinnati Reds in the 31st round of the 2014 Major League Baseball draft, but did not sign and instead attended San Jacinto Junior College. In his first season of college baseball, Palacios batted .376 with six doubles and 26 runs batted in (RBIs). In the offseason, Palacios signed a letter of intent to transfer to Auburn University for the 2016 season. As a sophomore with San Jacinto, he hit .364 with 12 doubles, nine triples, 36 RBIs, and 29 stolen bases. At the end of the season, Palacios was named the 37th best junior college prospect in the country. In his lone season with Auburn, Palacios batted .385 with five home runs, 23 RBIs, and 12 stolen bases.

Professional career

Toronto Blue Jays
The Toronto Blue Jays selected Palacios in the fourth round of the 2016 Major League Baseball draft, and he signed for a $438,100 signing bonus. He was assigned to the Rookie-level Gulf Coast League Blue Jays and appeared in 13 games before being promoted to the Short Season-A Vancouver Canadians. After 28 games in Vancouver, Palacios was promoted to the Class-A Lansing Lugnuts, where he finished his 2016 campaign. In 50 total games across three levels, Palacios batted .330 with 18 RBIs. He was assigned to Lansing for the entire 2017 season, and hit .280 with two home runs, 39 RBIs, and 12 stolen bases in 91 games.

On November 20, 2020, the Blue Jays added Palacios to their 40-man roster. On April 9, 2021, Palacios was promoted to the major leagues for the first time. He made his MLB debut that night as the starting right fielder against the Los Angeles Angels. Palacios was assigned to Triple-A Buffalo on May 3, 2021. He was designated for assignment on April 11, 2022.

Washington Nationals
On April 15, 2022, the Washington Nationals claimed Palacios from the Blue Jays off of waivers. On December 1, 2022, Palacios was sent outright off of the 40-man roster.

Pittsburgh Pirates
At the 2022 Winter Meetings, the Pittsburgh Pirates selected Palacios from the Nationals in the minor league phase of the Rule 5 draft.

Personal life
His brother, Richie, was drafted by the Cleveland Indians in the third round of the 2018 Major League Baseball draft. His uncle, Rey, played in Major League Baseball for the Kansas City Royals from 1988 to 1990. Palacios' mother is from Curaçao, and thus he was eligible to play for the Netherlands national baseball team and was selected to play for them in the 2023 World Baseball Classic.

See also
Rule 5 draft results

References

External links

1995 births
Living people
Sportspeople from Brooklyn
Baseball players from New York City
Baseball players from New York (state)
Major League Baseball outfielders
Toronto Blue Jays players
Washington Nationals players
San Jacinto Central Ravens baseball players
Auburn Tigers baseball players
Gulf Coast Blue Jays players
Vancouver Canadians players
Lansing Lugnuts players
Dunedin Blue Jays players
New Hampshire Fisher Cats players
Buffalo Bisons (minor league) players
Florida Complex League Blue Jays players
Rochester Red Wings players
2023 World Baseball Classic players
American people of Curaçao descent